Synuchus limbalis is a species of ground beetle in the subfamily Harpalinae. It was described by Lindroth in 1956.

References

Synuchus
Beetles described in 1956